Moonalice is the first studio album by Moonalice, released on April 14, 2009. Four tracks were released on the band's web-site in 2007, with a fifth track being posted later. The album contains the following: a standard music CD; and an optimized audio DVD with the music in high resolution stereo 24/96 WAV, 256 KPS MP3, 256 KPS AAC, and lossless FLAC formats, as well as two music videos for songs not among the album's audio tracks, "Whiter Shade of Pale" and "Tell Me It's OK". It was released on the "A Minor Label" label. The album was produced using XOΔE (CODE), a high fidelity audio standard and optimization system created by producer Burnett. All the main band members are credited with providing bass guitar, and management, booking, legal, art/design, and photography personnel all have "(and Bass)" attached to their credits, part of an in-joke related to the band's fictitious origin story.

Music videos
A music video was produced for the track "Listen to Those Eyes" produced by Jay Blakesberg.

Track listing
Studio tracks from official page
 "Bleeding of Love"
 "Unspoken Words"
 "I'm Glad You Think So" (R. McNamee)
 "Blink of an Eye" (Ann McNamee, Roger McNamee)
 "Eileen Aroon"
 "Kick It Open" (Pete Sears, Jeannette Sears)
 "Listen to Those Eyes" (A. McNamee)
 "I Ain't Ever Satisfied" (Steve Earle)
 "Dance Inside the Lightning"
 "Dusty Streets of Cairo"
 "This Changes Everything"

Personnel

Moonalice
 G. E. Smith – guitars, vocals, bass
 Roger McNamee – guitar, vocals, bass
 Barry Sless – guitar, vocals, pedal steel guitar, bass
 Pete Sears – keyboards, vocals, accordion, bass
 Jack Casady – bass
 James Sanchez – drums, bass
 Ann McNamee – percussion, vocals, bass

Guest artists
 Jay Bellerose — drums, percussion
 T Bone Burnett — guitar
 Dave Way — bass
 Roger Love — background vocals
 Stacy Parrish — background vocals
 Children's chorus on "This Changes Everything" — Simone Burnett, Madison Love, Riley Way

References

 Moonalice liner and DVD audio notes.

2009 albums
Albums produced by T Bone Burnett